The Gran Canaria giant lizard (Gallotia stehlini) is a species of lizard in the family Lacertidae. The species is found in the Canary Islands.

Etymology
The specific name, stehlini, is in honor of Swiss paleontologist Hans Georg Stehlin, who collected the holotype.

Description
It is among the largest reptiles within the family Lacertidae. The species comes in a variety of grays, browns, and reddish hues. Unlike their female counterparts, males exhibit sizable jowls, robust heads and overall greater body mass.

Diet
G. stehlini is a true omnivore. The young often consume various invertebrates, vegetation and soft fruits. As they mature, their diet largely consists of plant matter.

Geographic range
G. stehlini is endemic to Gran Canaria in the Canary Islands of Spain but it has been introduced to Fuerteventura.

Habitat

Reproduction
G. stehlini is oviparous.

References

Further reading
Cox, Siobhan C.; Carranza, Salvador; Brown, Richard P. (2010). "Divergence times and colonization of the Canary Islands by Gallotia lizards". Molecular Phylogenetics and Evolution 56 (2): 747–757. (corrigendum in 56: 1136).

Schenkel, Ehrenfried (1901). "Achter Nachtrag zum Katalog der herpetologischen Sammlung des Basler Museums ". Verhandlungen der Naturforschenden Gesellschaft in Basel 13: 142–199. (Lacerta galloti var. stehlini, new variation, p. 187). (in German).
Sindaco, Roberto; Jeremčenko, Valery K. (2008). The Reptiles of the Western Palearctic. 1. Annotated Checklist and Distributional Atlas of the Turtles, Crocodiles, Amphisbaenians and Lizards of Europe, North Africa, Middle East and Central Asia. (Monographs of the Societas Herpetologica Italica). Latina, Italy: Edizioni Belvedere. 580 pp. .

Reptiles of the Canary Islands
Gallotia
Reptiles described in 1901
Fauna of Gran Canaria
Taxa named by Ehrenfried Schenkel
Taxonomy articles created by Polbot